The 2018 Middle Tennessee Blue Raiders football team represented Middle Tennessee State University as a member of the East Division of Conference USA (C-USA) during the 2018 NCAA Division I FBS football season. Led by 13th-year head coach Rick Stockstill, the Blue Raiders compiled an overall record of 8–6 with a mark of 7–1 in conference play, winning the C-USA's East Division title. Middle Tennessee represented the East Division in the Conference USA Football Championship Game, falling to West Division champion, UAB. The Blue Raiders were invited to the New Orleans Bowl, where they lost to Appalachian State. The team played home games at Johnny "Red" Floyd Stadium in Murfreesboro, Tennessee.

Previous season
The Blue Raiders finished the 2017 season 7–6, 4–4 in C-USA play to finish in a tie for third place in the East Division. They received an invite to the Camellia Bowl where they defeated Arkansas State.

Preseason

Award watch lists
Listed in the order that they were released

Preseason All-CUSA team
Conference USA released their preseason all-CUSA team on July 16, 2018, with the Blue Raiders having four players selected.

Offense

Brent Stockstill – QB

Chandler Brewer – OL

Ty Lee – WR

Defense

Khalil Brooks – LB

Preseason media poll
Conference USA released their preseason media poll on July 17, 2018, with the Blue Raiders predicted to finish in third place in the East Division.

Schedule

Game summaries

at Vanderbilt

UT Martin

at Georgia

Florida Atlantic

at Marshall

at FIU

Charlotte

at Old Dominion

Western Kentucky

at UTEP

at Kentucky

UAB

UAB (C-USA Championship Game)

vs. Appalachian State (New Orleans Bowl)

References

Middle Tennessee
Middle Tennessee Blue Raiders football seasons
Middle Tennessee Blue Raiders football